Samuel Blakeley Hall Jr. (January 11, 1924 – April 10, 1994) was an American lawyer, politician, and judge. He was a member of the United States House of Representatives from Texas's 1st congressional district from 1976 to 1985 and a United States district judge of the United States District Court for the Eastern District of Texas from 1985 until his death in 1994.

Education and career

Born and raised in Marshall, Texas, Hall attended the College of Marshall where he met his future wife Mary Madeleine Segal. After graduating from the College of Marshall with an Associate of Arts degree in 1942, he attended the University of Texas before enlisting in the United States Army Air Corps to serve during World War II. On returning to Marshall after World War II, he married Mary Madeleine Segal and graduated from Baylor University in 1946. He received a Bachelor of Laws from Baylor Law School in 1948. After being admitted to the bar he returned to Marshall to practice law, where he was in private practice from 1948 to 1976.

Political career

Hall was unsuccessful in an attempt to receive the Democratic Party nomination for Congress in the 1st district in 1962. He served as chairman of Marshall's board of education from 1972 to 1976.

In 1976 Hall won a special election for the U.S. House after the death of incumbent Wright Patman. He was reelected five times and served on the Judiciary and Veterans' Affairs committees.

Federal judicial service

On April 17, 1985, Hall was nominated by President Ronald Reagan to a seat on the United States District Court for the Eastern District of Texas vacated by Judge Joseph Jefferson Fisher. The move was engineered by Republican Senator Phil Gramm as a way to demonstrate southern support for Reagan's administration—with many conservative Democratic areas of the southern states trending towards Republicans, Gramm and other observers assumed a Republican would win Hall's seat in a special election. Hall was quickly confirmed by the United States Senate on May 3, 1985, and subsequently resigned his seat in Congress to be sworn in as judge, receiving his commission on May 10, 1985. (Gramm's ploy to have Hall succeeded by a Republican failed when the special election was won by Democrat Jim Chapman, who defeated Republican Edd Hargett. ) Hall served on the bench until his death in Marshall on April 10, 1994. He was buried at New Grover Cemetery in Marshall.

Honor

The Sam B. Hall Federal Courthouse in Marshall was later renamed in his honor.

References

Sources
 
 
 
 

1924 births
1994 deaths
People from Marshall, Texas
Military personnel from Texas
East Texas Baptist University alumni
Baylor University alumni
Baylor Law School alumni
Judges of the United States District Court for the Eastern District of Texas
United States district court judges appointed by Ronald Reagan
20th-century American judges
United States Army Air Forces personnel of World War II
Democratic Party members of the United States House of Representatives from Texas
20th-century American politicians